James Robson may refer to:

James Robson (academic) (born 1965), professor of Chinese Buddhism and Daoism at Harvard University
James Robson (bookseller) (1733–1806), bookseller in London; see James Edwards (bookseller)
James Robson (doctor), team doctor for the Scotland national rugby union team
James Robson (poet and songwriter) (died 1757), Northumbrian landowner, poet, songwriter, “political criminal” and one time Jacobite rebel
James Robson (trade unionist) (1860–1934), British coal miners' leader
James Wells Robson (1867–1941), Manitoba politician active early in the 20th century
Jim Robson (born 1935), radio and television broadcaster
Jim Robson (politician) (1895–1975), Australian politician
James Robson (Oz), a fictional character in the television series Oz

See also
James Robinson (disambiguation)